Czechoslovakian men first competed at the 1907 World Championships as Bohemia.  They started competing as Czechoslovakia at the 1922 World Championships.  Women didn't start competing at the World Artistic Gymnastics Championships until 1934, where the Czechoslovakian women's team won gold.  At the start of 1993 Czechoslovakia split into two separate nations: the Czech Republic and Slovakia.

Medalists

Medal tables

By gender

By event

References 

World Artistic Gymnastics Championships
Gymnastics in Czechoslovakia